Vlamingh Head Lighthouse is a lighthouse which is situated  to the north of the settlement of Exmouth, Western Australia, overlooking Lighthouse Bay. The lighthouse is notable as being one of the few locations in Australia where both the sunrise and the sunset can be observed.

History
The first recorded sighting of this part of Australia was by the Dutch sailor Haevik Claezoon van Hillegom in 1618. His countryman Willem de Vlamingh then charted the headland in 1696. In 1801 Nicolas Baudin named the area Cape Murat.

The north west coast of Australia had been regarded as dangerous for many years. This coastline is one of the most hazardous stretches of coast in the world and the building of a lighthouse on this coast had long been considered. In 1907 a board of enquiry was set up and the captains of numerous coastal vessels were questioned to obtain their views on the best sites to build lighthouses on. Out of these, four locations were selected where lighthouses would be built in the subsequent two years. Being recommended as the fifth lighthouse along this stretch of coast, in 1909 the Harbour and Lights Department announced that a lighthouse was to be constructed at Vlamingh Head. Construction of the lighthouse started in November 1911, but it was to be delayed by bad drinking water, outbreaks of dysentery among the labourers and the requirement to transport all of the building materials and supplies by sea from Fremantle.

The light took two lighthouse keepers to keep its  light burning. The light used kerosene and flashed twice every 7.5 seconds. Keepers' quarters were provided nearby and the supplies of fuel and the keepers' provisions landed on the beach and transported to the lighthouse by  horse-drawn carriages on a tramway. The lighthouse operated for sixty years up to 1969 when the light was replaced by a light mounted on tower 11 at the US Naval Communications VLF site at Point Murat (Naval Communication Station Harold E. Holt).

In the Second World War the North West Cape was an important refuelling depot for US Navy ships and an airbase was developed at Learmonth which led to a radar station being built near the lighthouse. In 1953 a cyclone caused considerable damage to both the airbase and the radar station and caused extensive damage to the lighthouse and keepers' quarters, with the keepers themselves doing much of the repair work themselves.

Tourism
The lighthouse has become a tourist attraction and the end of a scenic drive from Exmouth. The Ningaloo Lighthouse Holiday Park is situated close to the Vlamingh Head Lighthouse. Tourists are attracted by the landscape, the sunset and whale watching with information panels are provided to assist in interpretation of the site.

References

External links

 Lighthose website

Lighthouses in Western Australia
State Register of Heritage Places in the Shire of Exmouth
Shire of Exmouth